Dimyristoylphosphatidylethanolamine is a phosphatidylethanolamine.  It has been used as part of a model membrane for Gram-negative bacteria.

References

Phosphatidylethanolamines